Amkeni is an album by Burundian singer-songwriter Bukuru Celestin and the jazz fusion group Snarky Puppy that was released in 2013. It is the first of two cooperative albums by Snarky Puppy and other performers that were recorded at the Jefferson Center in Roanoke, Virginia in 2013, with the second being Family Dinner – Volume 1.

Track listing
All song lyrics by Bukuru Celestin and all arrangements by Michael League; all music composed as noted.

Personnel
Source
Bukuru Celestin, vocals
Ephrazie Niyonzima, vocals
Elvanie Niyibigira, vocals
Furaha Ndayishimiyi, vocals
Roanoke International Choir, backing vocals on tracks 3, 4, 5

Snarky Puppy:
Michael League – electric guitar, baritone guitar, 6 & 12 string acoustic guitars, electric bass guitar, Moog bass & keyboards
Bob Lanzetti – electric guitar
Cory Henry – Hammond B3 organ & Fender Rhodes
Mike Maher – trumper & flugelhorn
Chris Bullock – tenor saxophone, flute & clarinet
Nate Werth – percussion
Jason "JT" Thomas – drums
Bill Laurance – piano on track 6

References

Snarky Puppy albums
2013 albums
Ropeadope Records albums